"No Mercy", or in its full title "No Mercy (The Fist of the Tiger)", is a 1995 song by Mark Wahlberg known at the time by the artistic name Marky Mark of the formation Marky Mark and the Funky Bunch. "No Mercy" appeared on the collaborative Prince Ital Joe and Marky Mark album The Remix Album, although this particular track is actually a solo effort by Marky Mark with no participation from Prince Ital Joe.

Background
Wahlberg had struck a friendship with Polish German boxer Dariusz Michalczewski. Marky Mark released the track "No Mercy" a  biographical song about Michalczewski, including excerpts in Polish from Michalczewski himself. "Tiger" appearing in the title and lyrics is reference to Michalczewski who was known as the "Tiger".

The boxer also appears in the music video that was directed by Frank Papenbroock and Joachim Kirschstein. The music video chronicled the early years of Michalczewski's life played by a young actor. It also includes boxing footage by Dariusz, Marky Mark and other boxing mates.

Tracklist
"No Mercy (The Fist of The Tiger)" (Radio Version) (3:43)
"No Mercy (The Fist of The Tiger)" (Extended Version) (4:26)
"No Mercy (The Fist of The Tiger)" (Club Mix) (5:05)
"No Mercy (The Fist of The Tiger)" (Hip-Hop-Mix) (3:51)

Credits
Written by: Alex Christensen, Frank Peterson, Mark Wahlberg
Producers: Alex Christensen, Frank Peterson
Guitar: Heiko Radke-Sieb

Charts
The single was released in Europe by Ultraphonic and Warner Music Europe and is copyrighted to EastWest Records GmbH. The single notably reached number 44 on the German Singles Chart.

Weekly charts

References

External links
Discogs.com: Marky Mark – No Mercy (The Fist Of The Tiger)
YouTube: Music video of "No Mercy"

1995 singles
1995 songs
Mark Wahlberg songs
Rap rock songs